Budhisagar Krishnappa Kunderan  (born Budhisagar Krishnappa Kunderam 2 October 1939 – 23 June 2006) was an Indian cricketer. He played as a wicket keeper for the most of his career, and was an exciting but unorthodox right-handed batsman who competed for international selection with contemporary Farokh Engineer. In his eighteen Tests between 1960 and 1967, he scored 981 runs with two centuries and a batting average of 32.70. With the gloves he took 23 catches and executed seven stumpings.

Career

Early matches
Budhi Kunderan made his first appearance in first class cricket for the Cricket Club of India against the touring West Indies in 1958–59. After just two first class matches, he was picked to play Test cricket for India against Australia in the next year. Through the fifties India had wicket keepers of about the same quality in Naren Tamhane, Probir Sen and Nana Joshi. Joshi and Tamhane had already been tried when Kunderan got his chance in the third Test. Kunderan got out hit wicket on his first appearance while attempting to pull Ian Meckiff but scored 71 and 33 in his next Test.

Kunderan had already played three Test matches when he made his Ranji Trophy debut in 1960. In his first Ranji appearance, he hit 205 for Railways against Jammu and Kashmir. His was one of eight double-centuries scored during Ranji Trophy debuts. His second first class hundred was also scored later in the year against the same opponents in a match that Railways won without losing a wicket.

Playing in the 1960s

From the early 1960s, Kunderan had a new competitor for the wicket keeping position in Farokh Engineer. Both played in the series against England at home and toured West Indies in 1961–62. Engineer was selected ahead of Kunderan when England again visited India in 1963–64, but he was found medically unfit on the eve of the first Test at Madras. Opening the innings, Kunderan hit 192 with 31 fours, 170 of which came on the first day of the match. He scored another hundred at Delhi and finished with an aggregate of 525 runs in the series. Since this series, only two other wicket keepers have scored more than 500 runs in a Test series - Denis Lindsay, 606 for South Africa v Australia in 1966-67 and Andy Flower, 540 for Zimbabwe v India in 2000–01.

The Indian selectors dropped both Kunderan and Engineer from the next series against Australia and instead went for K. S. Indrajitsinhji. Engineer was then recalled for the New Zealand series that followed while Kunderan played as an opening batsman in the place of injured Dilip Sardesai.

In 1965, Kunderan left his job in the Railways and appeared for Mysore and the South Zone. A side effect of this was that he was able to keep wickets to the bowling of Chandrasekhar, Prasanna and Venkatraghavan in domestic matches. Recalled against West Indies in 1966–67, Kunderan scored 79 in 92 minutes in the Bombay Test. Early on in the innings, he appeared to have been caught by Garry Sobers but as the batsman prepared to depart, Sobers indicated that he had taken the catch on the bounce. One Test later, Kunderan again found himself out of the team.

The team that toured England in 1967 included both Kunderan and Engineer, but from here Engineer asserted himself as the primary 'keeper. Kunderan played purely as a batsman in the second and third Tests of the series. When Sardesai retired with a hand injury in the Lord's Test, he opened with Engineer and topscored with 47 out of India's 110 all out. He opened both batting and bowling at Birmingham where India played four spinners. This was to be Kunderan's last Test.

Post-international career

He served as a professional in the Lancashire league and then with Drumpellier in the Western Union in Scotland. In the early 1980s, he played for Scotland in the Benson and Hedges Cup in England. Kunderan lived in Scotland from the turn of the 1970s. His brother Bharat, also a wicket-keeper, played first class cricket for Indian Universities in 1970–71.

Budhi Kunderan died from lung cancer at the age of 66. In June 2018, he was awarded with a Special Award by the Board of Control for Cricket in India (BCCI).

References
Footnotes

References
 Rahul Bhattacharya, Love Letters, The Nightwatchman, August 2013
 History of Drumpellier CC which briefly touches on Kunderan's Scottish career
 Interview with Kunderan
 Cricinfo Obituary
 Article by Partab Ramchand
 Sujit Mukherjee, Matched Winners, Orient Longman (1996), p 61-75
 Christopher Martin-Jenkins, The Complete Who's Who of Test Cricketers

External links
 
 Budhi Kunderan  at North Lanarkshire Sporting Hall Of Fame

1939 births
2006 deaths
India Test cricketers
Indian cricketers
Karnataka cricketers
South Zone cricketers
Railways cricketers
Scotland cricketers
State Bank of India cricketers
North Zone cricketers
Deaths from lung cancer
Deaths from cancer in Scotland
People from Dakshina Kannada district
Mangaloreans
Tulu people
Cricketers from Karnataka
Indian emigrants to Scotland
Wicket-keepers